This is a list of the National Register of Historic Places listings in Floyd County, Texas.

This is intended to be a complete list of properties listed on the National Register of Historic Places in Floyd County, Texas. There are three properties listed on the National Register in the county. One property is also a State Antiquities Landmark.

Current listings

The publicly disclosed locations of National Register properties may be seen in a mapping service provided.

|}

See also

National Register of Historic Places listings in Texas
Recorded Texas Historic Landmarks in Floyd County

References
 

Floyd County, Texas
Floyd County
Buildings and structures in Floyd County, Texas